Campeones de la vida (Champions of life) is a Mexican telenovela produced by TV Azteca in 2006 starring Gabriel Porras, Ana Seradilla and Luis Ernesto Franco. It is a remake of the Argentine telenovela of the same name.

Cast
Gabriel Porras
Ana Seradilla ... Isabel
Luis Ernesto Franco
Martha Mariana Castro
Hector Bonilla
Jesus Ochoa
Mayra Rojas
Gabriela Canudas ... Bety
Paco de la O ... Eugenio
Anna Ciochetti ... Miriam
Laura Luz ... Ana Maria
Hernan Mendoza ... Pedro Chaparro
Gabriela Roel
Carla Carillo
Marimar Vega
Hector Kotsifakis
Juan C. Martin del Campo
Fernando Alonso
Adrian Rubio
Guillermo Larrea
Humberto Bua
Mayra Sierra
Patricia Garza
Alfredo Herrera
Tizoc Arroyo
Antonio Gaona
Ursula Pruneda
Juan David Penagos

References

2006 telenovelas
2006 Mexican television series debuts
2006 Mexican television series endings
Mexican telenovelas
TV Azteca telenovelas
Mexican television series based on Argentine television series
Spanish-language telenovelas